Hendrik Karel Jan "Henk" Beernink (2 February 1910 – 22 August 1979) was a Dutch politician of the defunct Christian Historical Union (CHU) party now merged into the Christian Democratic Appeal (CDA) party and jurist.

Beernink attended a Gymnasium in Dordrecht from April 1922 until May 1928 and applied at the Utrecht University in June 1928 majoring in Law and obtaining a Bachelor of Laws degree in October 1929 and graduating with a Master of Laws degree in December 1932. Beernink worked as a civil servant for the municipality of Papendrecht from December 1932 until February 1939 and for the municipality of Rijswijk from February 1939 until April 1967 and as Municipal clerk from June 1945 until April 1967.

Beernink was elected as a Member of the House of Representatives after the election of 1946, taking office on 4 June 1946 serving as a frontbencher chairing the special parliamentary committee for the Financial Relationship Law and the de facto Whip and spokesperson for the Interior, Social Affairs, Housing and Spatial Planning, Culture, Press media and Postal Services. Beernink also served as Chairman of the Christian Historical Union from 9 July 1958 until 19 March 1966. In February 1963 the Leader of the Christian Historical Union and Parliamentary leader of the Christian Historical Union Hendrik Tilanus announced his retirement from national politics and that he wouldn't stand for the election of 1963, the Christian Historical Union leadership approached Beernink as his successor, Beernink accepted and became the Leader of the Christian Historical Union and the Lijsttrekker (top candidate) for the election, taking office on 20 February 1963. The Christian Historical Union made a small win, gaining 1 seat and now had 13 seats in the House of Representatives, Beernink subsequently became Parliamentary leader in the House of Representatives, taking office on 16 May 1963. The following second cabinet formation of 1963 resulted in a coalition agreement between the Christian Historical Union, the Catholic People's Party (KVP), the People's Party for Freedom and Democracy (VVD) and the Anti-Revolutionary Party (ARP) which formed the Cabinet Marijnen with Beernink opting to remain in the House of Representatives instead of accepting a cabinet post in the new cabinet and he continued to serve in the House of Representatives as Parliamentary leader. For the election of 1967 Beernink served for a second time as Lijsttrekker. The Christian Historical Union suffered a small loss, losing 1 seat and now had 12 seats in the House of Representatives. The following cabinet formation of 1967 resulted in a coalition agreement between the Catholic People's Party, the People's Party for Freedom and Democracy (VVD), the Anti-Revolutionary Party (ARP) and the Christian Historical Union (CHU) which formed the Cabinet De Jong with Beernink appointed as Minister of the Interior, taking office on 5 April 1967. On 12 April 1967 Beernink announced that he was stepping down as Leader in favor of Parliamentary leader in the House of Representatives Jur Mellema. In March 1967 Beernink announced that he wouldn't stand for the election of 1971. Following the cabinet formation of 1971 Beernink was not giving a cabinet post in the new cabinet, the Cabinet De Jong was replaced by the Cabinet Biesheuvel I on 6 July 1971.

Beernink semi-retired from active politics and became active in the public sector and occupied numerous seats as a nonprofit director on several supervisory boards and served on several state commissions and councils on behalf of the government (Electoral Council, Public Pension Funds APB and the Cadastre Agency)

Beernink was known for his abilities as a manager and team leader. Beernink continued to comment on political affairs until his is death at the age of 69.

Decorations

References

External links

Official
  Mr. H.K.J. (Henk) Beernink Parlement & Politiek

 

 

 

 

1910 births
1979 deaths
Chairmen of the Christian Historical Union
City and town clerks
Christian Historical Union politicians
Commanders of the Order of Orange-Nassau
Commanders of the Order of the Netherlands Lion
Dutch members of the Dutch Reformed Church
Dutch nonprofit directors
Leaders of the Christian Historical Union
Ministers of the Interior of the Netherlands
Members of the House of Representatives (Netherlands)
People from Maarssen
People from Rijswijk
Utrecht University alumni
20th-century Dutch civil servants
20th-century Dutch jurists
20th-century Dutch politicians